Alexandra Levit (born 1976) is an American writer, consultant, speaker, workplace expert and futurist. She has written ten business and workplace books, and is currently a nationally syndicated columnist for the Wall Street Journal. In 2019, she was named to the Thinkers50 Radar List. In 2021, she received a certification in strategic foresight from the University of Houston.

Early life and education
Levit was born in Minneapolis, Minnesota, and raised in Gaithersburg, Maryland. She was the salutatorian of her class at Watkins Mill High School, where she was active in environmental causes and acted in several theatrical productions. She graduated from Northwestern University in 1998 with a degree in psychology.

Career
In her early career, Levit worked in New York as a public relations representative for a Long Island software company, where she felt a struggle to achieve visibility and recognition for her efforts at work. She went on to become a vice president at public relations firm Edelman, with a focus was on creating online campaigns in the early days of social media. In 2003, she decided to use her workplace experiences to write a guide for young professionals navigating the business world. The ensuing book, They Don't Teach Corporate in College, was published in 2004 and started Levit's transition into a career as a workplace consultant, speaker, columnist and author, which became her full-time profession after leaving Edelman in 2008.

In 2004, Levit founded Inspiration at Work, a business and workplace consulting firm based in Chicago that advised universities, nonprofit associations and companies. From 2009 to 2010, she wrote a nationally syndicated career advice column for The Wall Street Journal. She wrote The Corporate Freshman column for the Huffington Post from 2008 to 2011, and has also written for Forbes, Fortune, Business Insider, Fast Company, Mashable, Business 2 Community CityLab, and The New York Times, including a 2013 report on global business competence she wrote while living in London, and a 2016 article about artificial intelligence in the workplace. She has written ten business and career books, which typically draw from surveys of professionals to offer guidance on such topics as getting a desirable job, changing careers, managing a multi-generational workforce, and work habits that will help achieve success. She writes frequently about the intersection of technology and the workplace, and consults with companies about preparing for the workplace of the future. Her advice has been featured in numerous media outlets, including The New York Times, Chicago Tribune, USA Today, Fast Company, Cosmopolitan, Entrepreneur, ABC News, Fox News, CBS News, NPR, Marketplace, Yahoo! Finance, Time, Vogue, New York Post and Mic.

In 2009, Levit served on the Business Roundtable's Springboard Project, which advised the Obama administration on workplace issues. The following year, she helped develop JobSTART 101, a free online course for college students and recent graduates to help them learn the necessary skills for success as entry-level employees. In 2011, she worked with the Department of Labor under the Obama administration to develop a new career-transitioning program for veterans. Also in 2011, as a member of DeVry University's Career Advisory Board, she co-founded the Career Advisory Board's Job Preparedness Indicator, an annual study of the US job market that was issued for six years. The survey was designed to track the disparity between what hiring managers say they're looking for in candidates and the skills those candidates actually possess. She contributed to the Deloitte millennial leadership studies from 2014 through 2017. In 2016, Levit presented a five-minute Ignite-style talk on the future workplace at DisruptHR at 1871 in Chicago. In 2017, she presented a TEDx talk on the future of work in Evanston, Illinois, and spoke at South by Southwest alongside technology entrepreneur Randi Zuckerberg and DeVry University president Rob Paul. 

In 2018, Levit published the international best selling book Humanity Works: Merging Technologies and People for the Workforce of the Future. The book was printed in multiple languages, and Levit presented corresponding workshops on five continents. In 2019, she received the Thinkers50 Radar Award for her ideas on the future of work and launched a podcast called Workforce 2030. She also received a certification in strategic foresight from the University of Houston, where she studied the future of the retail workforce.

During the 2020-2021 coronavirus pandemic, Levit applied for and received a federal grant with the National Institute of Mental Health to create an app that will use psychotherapy techniques to alleviate the emotional distress caused by unemployment.  Partnering with Northwestern University researchers, Levit will demonstrate her product’s effectiveness via a 2023 clinical trial. 

In 2022, Levit returned to the Wall Street Journal to anchor a new section and newsletter, The Workplace Report, which advises CEOs and CHROs on modern employment issues and features interviews with leaders including EEOC Commissioner Keith Sonderling and National  Labor Relations Board Deputy General Counsel Jennifer Abruzzo. 

Levit has formed a partnership with artificial intelligence HR technology company Eightfold AI, with which she will co-author her next book, Deep Talent, in 2023. She is also a member of the HR think tank The Workforce Institute, the Association for Professional Futurists, the Grey Swan Guild, and the Hacking HR global community

Honors
 Money magazine's Best Online Career Expert, 2010
 Forbes magazine's Top 100 Websites for Women, 2010, 2012
 Northwestern University Emerging Leader, 2012
 Mashable's 14 Career Experts to Follow on Twitter, 2012
 Forbes magazine's Top 100 Websites For Your Career, 2013
American Management Association Top Leader, 2015
Thinkers50 Radar, 2019

Bibliography
 They Don't Teach Corporate in College: A Twenty-Something's Guide to the Business World, Franklin Lakes, NJ: Career Press, 2004; revised edition, 2009; third edition, 2014; fourth edition, 2019
 How'd You Score That Gig?: A Guide to the Coolest Jobs [and How to Get Them], New York: Ballantine Books, 2008
 Success for Hire: Simple Strategies to Find and Keep Outstanding Employees, Baltimore: ASTD Press, 2008
 New Job, New You: A Guide to Reinventing Yourself in a Bright New Career, New York: Ballantine Books, 2009
 Blind Spots: The 10 Business Myths You Can't Afford to Believe on Your New Path to Success, New York: Berkley Books, 2011
 Mom B.A.: Essential Business Advice From One Generation to the Next, New York: Motivational Press, 2017
Humanity Works: Merging Technologies and People for the Workforce of the Future, London: Kogan Page, 2018
Deep Talent: How to Transform Your Organization and Empower Your Employees Through AI, London: Kogan Page, 2023

References

External links
 Official website
(5) https://thinkers50.com/radar-2019/alexandra-levit/

Living people
1976 births
Writers from Minneapolis
People from Gaithersburg, Maryland
Northwestern University alumni
American advice columnists
American women columnists
American management consultants
Futurologists
The Wall Street Journal people
American women non-fiction writers
21st-century American women